Jehan Casinader is a New Zealand journalist and television presenter.

Early life
Jehan was born in New Zealand to Sri Lankan immigrant parents and raised in Lower Hutt. His father had been a print journalist in Sri Lanka, and worked at The Dominion Post after moving to New Zealand, so news and current affairs was a constant component of Jehan's home life and upbringing. 

Jehan's first television appearance was on the game show Small Talk hosted by Jason Gunn in 1997. At the age of 13 Jehan successfully pitched a story on The Lord of the Rings to the Holmes programme on TV One. Jehan then began writing for youth magazine Tearaway, which gave him the opportunity at the age of 15 to interview then Prime Minister Helen Clark. Jehan went on to successfully pitch multiple features to The New Zealand Herald as a 16 year old.

Jehan studied Bachelor of Arts (majoring in Public Policy and International Relations) at Victoria University of Wellington.

Journalism career
After finishing university Jehan was employed on TVNZ's Close Up and remained on staff when the programme rebooted as Seven Sharp. In 2016 Jehan moved to TVNZ’s current affairs programme, Sunday

Jehan produced and presented the talk show The Inside Word in 2018 which aired on TVNZ’s Duke channel, tackling tough topics such as negative body image, alcoholism and cyberbullying.

Jehan won 'Best Team Video' at the 2018 Voyager Media Awards for his team's coverage of the 2017 Edgecumbe flood. Jehan was also named 'Reporter of the Year' at the 2018 New Zealand Television Awards.

In 2019 Jehan presented an episode of What Next? on TVNZ 1 exploring future advances in medicine.

References

External links 
 jehancasinader.co.nz
 TVNZ's Sunday Profile Page
 

New Zealand television presenters
Victoria University of Wellington alumni
Year of birth missing (living people)
Living people
New Zealand people of Sri Lankan descent